Dyschirius interior is a species of ground beetle in the subfamily Scaritinae. It was described by Fall in 1922.

References

interior
Beetles described in 1922